Benjamin Jeffrey Steinbauer (born July 28, 1977) is an American director and camera operator, who is best known for directing the feature documentary Winnebago Man (2009). Steinbauer has directed other documentaries, including Chop & Steele (2022), which premiered at the Tribeca Film Festival, Brute Force (2012) and Heroes From The Storm (2017), as well as episodic television for the PBS show Stories of the Mind and the CBS show Pink Collar Crimes.

Life and career
Steinbauer graduated from Edmond Memorial High School in Edmond, Oklahoma, in 1995 and earned a B.A. in Theatre and Film from The University of Kansas in 2001, where he sits on the Professional Advisory Board of K.U. Film. While in college, he began making documentaries and music videos for Forty Minutes of Hell, Everest, and The Danny Pound Band

In 2002, Steinbauer directed behind-the-scenes videos for The Flaming Lips, Fight Test, "Sponge Bob and Patrick Confront the Psychic Wall of Energy" and The Flaming Lips & Cat Power, performing on Austin City Limits. He went on tour and operated camera on Bradley Beesley's documentary, The Fearless Freaks, about the Flaming Lips.

In 2004, Steinbauer started the graduate film program at The University of Texas at Austin. His pre-thesis film, The Next Tim Day, a documentary about a young crack dealer turned independent filmmaker, won best documentary at Cinema Texas and ran on PBS "The Territory." In 2005, he won a Princess Grace Award for Filmmaking for his graduate thesis film, which went on to become Winnebago Man. After graduating, Steinbauer taught Intro To Filmmaking at The University of Texas at Austin from 2007 to 2009 and won a teaching award for Teacher of the Year for the College of Communications.

Steinbauer's comedy documentary Winnebago Man premiered at the South by Southwest Film Festival in 2009. Winnebago Man was released theatrically by Kino Lorber in the U.S. and by Kinosmith in Canada in July 2010. Michael Moore called it "One of the funniest documentaries ever made” and Roger Ebert named it one of his favorite films of 2010.

Steinbauer directed the short documentary Brute Force, which was shot by cinematographer Jody Lee Lipes and premiered at South by Southwest Film Festival in 2012. He wrote and directed the short film Documentary Subjects Wanted (2013) for Funny or Die, starring Rory Scovel and Matt Jones. In 2014, he co-directed Calls To Okies: The Park Grubbs Story with Bradley Beesley. The short premiered at the South by Southwest Film Festival film festival in 2015 and was awarded a Vimeo Staff Pick.

Steinbauer wrote and directed the short documentary, The Superlative Light (2016), which was shot in both traditional 2D as well as in virtual reality (VR). Both versions of the film premiered at the South by Southwest Film Festival in 2016. The film was featured in Vice's Creator's Project: Short of the Week, and premiered online at Nowness.

In 2016, Steinbauer directed five episodes of Stories of the Mind for PBS: "A Place To Belong", "Coping With Illness", "Beating Anxiety", "Facing Suicide", and "The Critical Years". The series, produced by Arcos Films, won multiple Emmys in the Lonestar Category. His 2016 documentary, Slow To Show, was acquired by The New York Times Op-Docs and awarded a Vimeo Staff Pick.

After Hurricane Harvey, Steinbauer teamed up with Texas Monthly to make Heroes From the Storm (2017), which was awarded a Vimeo Staff Pick and selected for the U.S. State Department's 2018–2019 American Film Showcase, where it screened at the U.S. Embassy in Pakistan.

In 2018, Steinbauer directed eight episodes of the CBS comedic docuseries Pink Collar Crimes, hosted by Marcia Clark. Episodes included "Minivan Mom Bank Robber", "The Queen of Coupons", and "Jackpot Jackie". Steinbauer's documentary Siren Song, which he co-directed with Berndt Mader, premiered at the 2019 Austin Film Festival.

In 2022, Steinbauer premiered his new feature-length comedy documentary, Chop & Steele, which he co-directed with Mader, at the Tribeca Film Festival.

The Bear
Steinbauer co-owns the production company The Bear, which was founded in 2007, with writer and director Berndt Mader. The Bear is a production company based in Austin, Texas. Its feature film credits include Chop & Steele (2022), directed by Steinbauer and Mader, Booger Red (2015), directed by Mader; Prince Avalanche (2013), directed by David Gordon Green; Double Play (2013), directed by Gabe Klinger; 5 Time Champion (2011); directed by Mader; Slacker 2011 (2011), directed by Steinbauer, Mader, and various other Austin-based directors; and Winnebago Man (2009), directed by Steinbauer.

Awards and nominations
In 2005, Steinbauer was awarded the Princess Grace Award for Filmmaking for his graduate thesis film, which went on to become Winnebago Man. Steinbauer was named "one of the best emerging Texas filmmakers of 2009" by Texas Monthly for his documentary Winnebago Man.

Winnebago Man won Best Documentary at the Sarasota Film Festival, an Audience Award at CineVegas Film Festival, Audience Top 10 at Hot Docs Film Festival, the Founder Prize at Traverse City Film Festival, and Best Documentary at the Edmonton International Film Festival. Winnebago Man was also in the official selection for IDFA and Sheffield Doc/Fest. The Austin Film Critics Association named Winnebago Man the Best Austin Film for 2010.

Steinbauer's 2012 film Brute Force won Best Documentary Short at Sidewalk Moving Pictures Festival in Birmingham, Alabama, and screened at the New Media Film Festival in Los Angeles, California.

Media appearances
Steinbauer appeared on The Tonight Show with Jay Leno in 2010.

Filmography
Chop & Steele (2022)
Siren Song (2019)
Pink Collar Crimes (2018, eight episodes)
Heroes From the Storm (2017)
Slow To Show (2016)
Stories of the Mind (2016, five episodes)
The Superlative Light (2016)
Calls To Okies: The Park Grubbs Story (2015)
Documentary Subjects Wanted (2013)
Brute Force (2012)
Slacker 2011 (2011)
Winnebago Man (2009)

References

American film directors
Living people
1977 births
People from Wichita, Kansas
Princess Grace Awards winners